Thakurgaon Government College is an honors-level degree college in Thakurgaon, Bangladesh. It is situated in Thakurgaon town nearest to the south-east of the Tangon River. From this college, In west Thakurgaon Railway Station and in east Thakurgaon Bus-stand(old) are located. The college authority has declared their college as a campus free from politics, drug & smoking. This college is affiliated with Bangladesh National University. On 1 March 1980, this college was named Thakurgaon Government College after nationalized.

History
The college was established in 1959. On 8 June 1959, it was raised a demand to established a college in Thakurgaon in meeting of "Sub-division Social Development Fund Committee". On that meeting has been taken a decision to establish this college. That times, this college was started with fifty students with temporarily appointed principal Sir Rustom Ali Khan who was the headmaster of Thakurgaon High School.

Campus 

The excellent environment with green trees and the crowding of students have made the campus of 31 acres more living and more animated. There has Science, Business, Arts and Administrative buildings and also a Library. There has also Dormitory of Teachers, Mosque, Ponds, Computer Lab, Sahid Minar and play ground.

Total amount of land of this college is 33 acres.

There has a rich library as name as "Central Library". Total number of books in seminar is 10,859 and the total number of books in central library is 12,844.

Academics
In 1997-1998 session of this college, Bangladesh National University confessed Thakurgaon Degree College as a Honor's College after authorizing to open Honor's course in economics, accounting, mathematics and political science and next year has been confessed to open other six subject such as botany, English, management, Bengali, zoology and Islamic history and culture. In 2010-2011 session, philosophy and history were included in Honor's course and physics, chemistry in 2011-2012 session. On 23 April 2011, it opened master's course in four subjects: English, Bengali, economics, and botany.

The total number of students is 11,101 with H.S.C, Honor's, Degree(Pass) and Master's.

The total number of teachers is 75.

The college offers Higher School Certificate, Degree (Pass), Honor's and Master's courses.

Higher School Certificate 
 Science
 Business
 Humanities

Degree (Pass) 

 B.A.
 B.S.S.
 B.Sc.
 B.B.S.

Honor's 

 Bengali 
 English
 Economics
 Management
 Botany
 Zoology
 Political Science
 Islamic History and Culture
 Philosophy
 Accounting
 Mathematics
 Chemistry
 Physics
 History

Master's

 English
 Bengali
 Economics
 Botany

The examination pass rate is: Higher Secondary Certificate (2013) 83.03%, Degree(2011) 68.52%, Honor's (2010) 93.35%।

Result of public examination of last five years

Result of Higher Secondary Certificate

Result of Degree (Pass)

2011

Result of Honor's Final Examination

Organizations of volunteer 
BNCC, Rovar, Red crescent, Badhon.

References

External links 
 http://www.tgc.edu.bd

Educational institutions established in 1959
1959 establishments in East Pakistan
Colleges in Thakurgaon District
Universities and colleges in Thakurgaon District